Pima fosterella is a species of snout moth. It is found in North America, including Alberta, Washington, Colorado, Utah and New Mexico.

References

Moths described in 1888
Phycitini
Pima (moth)